Nauka i Zhizn (Science and Life) is a science magazine first issued during the years 1890–1900 in Imperial Russia, and then since 1934 in the Soviet Union (and continued in the Russian Federation today).

References

External links
Nauka i Zhizn website 

1890 establishments in the Russian Empire
Magazines established in 1890
Magazines published in Moscow
Magazines published in the Soviet Union
Popular science magazines
Russian-language magazines
Science and technology magazines published in Russia
Science and technology in the Soviet Union